a.k.a. Hole in One a.k.a. The Pit, is a 1957 black-and-white comedy/mystery Japanese film directed by Kon Ichikawa.

Plot
A reporter, Nagako Kita (Machiko Kyō), is fired for writing about police corruption. To make money, she hides while a weekly magazine publishes photos of her, and offers a prize to the person who discovers her. A group of three bank embezzlers, So Yamamura, Eiji Funakoshi, and Sotoji Mukui (Fujio Harumoto) employ Mukui's younger sister Fukiko as a fake employee at the bank and plan to make her disappear when the real woman appears again and blame the crime on her.

When she contacts Mukui about the crime, she finds him dead and Fukiko pulls a gun on her. She contacts the policeman who was fired, who is now a private detective.

Staff
The art director was Tomoo Shimogawara.

Cast 
 Machiko Kyō as Nagako Kita
 Eiji Funakoshi as Koisuke Sengi
 So Yamamura as Keikichi Shirasu
 Kenji Sugawara as police Sarumaru
 Jun Hamamura as taxi driver
 Fujio Harumoto as Sotoji Mikui
 Sumiko Hidaka as Takeko Nakamura
 Shintarō Ishihara as writer
 Ryuichi Ishii as Shuta Torigai
 Yasuko Kawakami as Fukiko Mukui
 Tanie Kitabayashi as Suga Akabane
 Bontarō Miyake as chief editor Oya
 Mantarō Ushio as Sahei

References

1957 films
Japanese comedy mystery films
Japanese black-and-white films
Films directed by Kon Ichikawa
Daiei Film films
1950s comedy mystery films
Films with screenplays by Natto Wada
Films with screenplays by Kon Ichikawa
Films scored by Yasushi Akutagawa
1950s Japanese films